Dominica is an island-nation in the Caribbean that is part of the Lesser Antilles chain of islands.

 Anse Du Mé River
 Aouya River
 Balthazar River
 Barry River
 Batali River
 Beauplan River
 Belfast River
 Bell Hall River
 Belle Fille River
 Bellibu River
 River Bibiay
 Bioche River
 Blenheim River
 Boeri River
 Boetica River
 River Bouleau
 River Bway
 Canal River
 River Canari
 Canefield River
 Cario River
 Castle Bruce River
 Check Hall River
 River Claire
 Clarke's River
 Colihaut River
 Coulibistrie River
 Crayfish River
 Demitrie River
 Delaford River
 Douce River
 Dublanc River
 Eden River
 Espagnole River
 Fond Figues River
 Geneva River
 River Gillon
 Good Hope River
 Hampstead River
 Indian River
 River Jack
 Lagon River
 Lagoon River
 Lamoins River (Lamothe River)
 La Ronde River
 Layou River
 Loubiere River
 Macoucheri River
 Mahaut River
 Mahaut River
 Malabuka River
 Mamelabou River
 Maréchal River
 Massacre River
 Matthieu River
 Melville Hall River
 Mero River
 Micham River
 North River
 River Ouayaneri
 Pagua River
 Penton River
 Perdu Temps River
 Picard River
 Point Mulâtre River
 River Quanery
 Rosalie River
 Roseau River
 Saint Joseph River
 Saint Marie River
 Saint Sauveur River
 Salée River (Dominica)
 Salisbury River
 Sari Sari River
 Savane River
 River Subaya
 River Sarisari
 Taberi River
 Tarou River
 Thibaud River
 Torité River
 Toucari River
 Toulaman River
 Trois Pitons River
 White River (River Blanche)
 Woodford Hill River

References
 Map of Dominica
, GEOnet Names Server
 Water Resources Assessment of Dominica, Antigua and Barbuda, and St. Kitts and Nevis

 
Dominica
Rivers
Dominica